German Silesia may refer to:
Province of Silesia, a province of Prussia before 1919
Province of Upper Silesia (1919–1945)
Province of Lower Silesia (1919–1945)

See also
 Silesian German, a dialect of German spoken in Silesia